John Russ was an American college football coach. He served as the head football coach at Tulane University in 1906. Tulane recorded a 0–4–1 record that season.

Head coaching record

References

Year of birth missing
Year of death missing
Tulane Green Wave football coaches